Templers may refer to:

 Templers, South Australia is a town in South Australia
 Templers (religious believers) are members of the Temple Society

See also
Instituts-Templers, a district of Lleida, Catalonia, Spain
Templer, an English surname
Templer (disambiguation)